
Vossius was a restaurant in Amsterdam, Netherlands. It was a fine dining restaurant that held one Michelin star from 2002 to 2003.

Co-owners of the restaurant were head chef Rob Kranenborg, maître d'hôtel John Vincke (1955-2007) and R. van Kampen.

Vossius was a luxurious restaurant that aimed for three Michelin stars. The owners used the best materials available, including a custom built Molteni stove and ceilings decorated with gold leaf. The project ended in bankruptcy after two years. The economic malaise gave the final blow to the restaurant.

See also
List of Michelin starred restaurants in the Netherlands

References 

Restaurants in Amsterdam
Michelin Guide starred restaurants in the Netherlands
Defunct restaurants in the Netherlands